Eagle Crest Resort is located in Ypsilanti, Michigan, located in the southeast part of the state. The resort consists of the Ann Arbor Marriott Ypsilanti at Eagle Crest, Eastern Michigan University's Eagle Crest Conference Center and Eagle Crest Golf Club. The facility was built in 1989. In 2006, Golf Digest gave the golf course a 4 out of 5 star rating.

Facility

The resort is 137 acres located adjacent to Ford Lake. The resort is just off Interstate 94 in Ypsilanti. The facility was built in 1989 and is designed by Karl V. Litten. The facility is broken down into three parts hotel, conference center and a golf course. The facility also has a jogging trail and tennis courts. The tennis courts is used by Eastern Michigan Woman's Tennis. As well, the golf course is home to EMU Men's and Women's Golf. The conference center is owned by Eastern Michigan University has  of meeting space. The resort is also part of the International Association of Conference Centers, IACC.

Hotel
The hotel has 235 rooms. The hotel is not run by Eastern Michigan University but by Marriott International. The hotel's name is The Ann Arbor Marriott Ypsilanti at Eagle Crest. The hotel went through a multimillion-dollar renovation in 2008.

Golf Course
The 18-hole course is 6,750 yards total in length and is a par 72 course. The course has a parkland style and a bent fairway grass. The course is only open between March and November. In 2006, the course was given a 4 star rating out of 5 by Golf Digest.

See also
 Eastern Michigan Eagles

References

Golf clubs and courses in Michigan
Ypsilanti, Michigan
Eastern Michigan University
Eastern Michigan Eagles
College golf clubs and courses in the United States
Tourist attractions in Washtenaw County, Michigan
Event venues established in 1989
1989 establishments in Michigan